The Ailaga-Abiqu church is a ruined medieval Eastern Orthodox church in Abkhazia, an entity in the South Caucasus with a disputed political status. It is located at the village of Bombora, on the Black Sea coast, 5 km west of the town of Gudauta.

History 
Ailaga-Abiqu is a complex of three ruined churches, which, based on their architectural features, can be dated to the period of the 8th-10th century. The original name of the church is unknown and there are no historical records on its construction. The current name is a local Abkhaz popular designation, literally meaning "a tangled tower." The largest—and best preserved—of the three churches is a northern one. Its extant northern wall rises up to 6.8 metres. It is a single-nave design with a pentahedral apse—which is of the same width as the nave—and a narrow narthex attached to the west. Remnants of two pairs of pilasters in the longitudinal walls indicate that the church was vaulted. The walls were faced with limestone and sandstone slabs. The only survived adornment is a Christian cross carved in relief on the southern entrance wall. The two closely adjacent smaller churches were apparently built later in the 10th or 11th century. One of these has two levels, of which only the lower one survives. It might have served as a burial chamber for local rulers.

References

External link 
 Ailaga-Abiqu church. Historical monuments of Abkhazia — Government of the Autonomous Republic of Abkhazia.

Churches in Abkhazia